I9, i9 or I-9 may refer to:

Science and technology
 Intel Core i9, a line of high performance processors of the Skylake-X and Kaby Lake-X range
 Gulftown, microprocessors originally rumored to be called the Intel Core i9
 Straight-nine engine, a straight engine with nine cylinders, usually diesel engines used for ship propulsion
 ICD-9, a coding system for medical diagnoses and procedures

Other uses
 Form I-9, a U.S. Citizenship and Immigration Services form
 Interstate 9, a proposed upgrade to California State Route 99
 Skaraborg Regiment (infantry), a Swedish Army infantry regiment disbanded in 1942
 , an Imperial Japanese Navy submarine

See also
 I Nine, an American band